Chester ("Chet") Willard Newton (September 18, 1903 – May 11, 1966) was an Olympic wrestler for the United States.  He won a silver medal in the featherweight division at the 1924 Summer Olympics in Paris, France, losing only to fellow Oregon State University alumnus and teammate Robin Reed in the finals.  Reed was also the only man to defeat Newton at the Olympic Trials in New York.

While at Oregon State, Newton was also a member of Sigma Pi fraternity and the cross country team.  When his eligibility for collegiate wrestling ended he became a wrestling coach for the college.  After graduation he became a teacher in Tillamook, Oregon.

He was elected to the Oregon Sports Hall of Fame in 1980 and to the Oregon State University Athletic Hall of Fame in 1991.

He died in a car crash in Oregon City, Oregon in 1966.

References

1903 births
1966 deaths
Oregon State Beavers wrestlers
Wrestlers at the 1924 Summer Olympics
American male sport wrestlers
Road incident deaths in Oregon
Sportspeople from Canby, Oregon
Wrestlers from Oregon
Olympic silver medalists for the United States in wrestling
Medalists at the 1924 Summer Olympics
20th-century American people